Haganeyama Transmitter (はがね山標準電波送信所) is an LF-time signal transmitter at Fuji-cho, Saga-city, Saga-ken, Japan used for transmitting the time signal JJY on 60 kHz. The Haganeyama site is one of two JJY transmitters, another is the Otakadoyama site.

Summy 
 NAME：NICT Haganeyama LF station
 Location：Summit of Mt. Hagane, Fuji-cho, Saga-city, Saga-ken
 Elevation：about 900m
 Latitude：33°27'56.0"N
 Longitude：130°10'32.0"E
 License：NICT
 Station purpose：Transmitting the official Japanese government frequency standards and time signal
 Frequency form：250H A1B
 Frequency：60kHz
 Antenna power：50kW（Antenna efficiency: about 45%）
 Antenna form：Umbrella type 200m high
 Operation time：continuously
 Operation start：2001/10/01
 Range：About 1,000 km
 Transmission method :

See also
 Otakadoyayama Transmitter

Reference

External links
 http://jjy.nict.go.jp/jjy/trans/index-e.html

Towers in Japan
Radio masts and towers